Rusztem Vámbéry (February 29, 1872, in Budapest – October 24, 1948, in New York) was a judge, politician and criminologist of international standing.

He was the son of the famed orientalist Ármin Vámbéry. Edward Prince of Wales (later King Edward VII of the United Kingdom) was his godfather. He studied law in Halle and Budapest. In Hungary, he had opposed the policy of Béla Kun's Soviet Republic and Miklós Horthy's Regency. He lived in the U.S. from 1938, teaching at the New School for Social Research in New York. He was the Hungarian ambassador to the U.S. from September 5, 1947, to May 2, 1948.

External links 

1872 births
1948 deaths
Hungarian Jews
Martin Luther University of Halle-Wittenberg alumni
Ambassadors of Hungary to the United States
Members of the National Assembly of Hungary (1945–1947)